The Mother's Right Foundation (Interregional Charitable Public Foundation ‘Pravo Materi’) is a Russian, non-profit, non-government human rights organization which works to protect the rights of families whose sons died in military service as a result of hazing, criminal actions, unsanitary living conditions, unhealthy psychological environment, etc.

According to the information of human rights activists, 3,000 people die annually while performing military service in the Russian army, and in many cases parents of dead soldiers do not receive any support from the government.

The organization was established in 1989 under the original name ‘Association of Parents Whose Sons Died in the Army on the USSR Territory during Peacetime’. The foundation was granted an official registration by the Ministry of Justice of the Russian Federation on March 4, 1993, and then was re-registered by the Moscow Justice Department on June 16, 1999. The founder and the current leader of the organization is Veronika Marchenko, the first Russian woman to receive the International Women of Courage Award (2009).

"The story of the establishment and development of the Mother’s Right Foundation is unique …. At the same time this story reflects the evolution of the human rights movement and, moreover, the evolution of the entire ‘third sector’ in Russia during the 1990s."

 — Columbia Law School. Pursuing the Public Interest. New York. 2001;
   Yurist. Pursuing the Public Interest.  Moscow. 2004.
Annually over 3,000 families of dead soldiers contact the foundation with requests for help, as ‘very often parents are the only people who want to ensure a fair investigation into the deaths of soldiers’.

The foundation was established as a professional charitable organization, and the foundation's lawyers work pro bono (lat., free of charge, for public good) providing support to parents of dead soldiers.

In 2007, there were 396 articles published about the foundation by the independent media.

Objectives and Tasks 

The mission of the organization is to facilitate the promotion of the following concepts in Russia:

 The idea of the rule-of-law state, where the needs of citizens have become a real priority of the state;
 Access to legal aid for those in need;
 Professionalization of the armed forces.

The objective of the organization's work is:

The foundation's lawyers work to facilitate effective investigation of all cases that involve deaths of conscripts during military service and realization of their parents’ right to fair trial.

Work Scope 

1. The foundation educates parents and widows of dead soldiers about their legal rights and represents their rights in courts of all instances.
 

2. The foundation is engaged in lawmaking: it actively promotes and lobbies for amendments to the current legislative framework.

3. The foundation conducts sociological surveys on human rights violations in the army.
 

4. The foundation publishes two periodicals:

 Dead Soldiers Memory Book. The periodical is a collection of stories of victims of violence in the army. Each book has short bios and photos of hundreds of young men who died in military service during peacetime. The foundation continues its work to find opportunities to publish new editions of the book, as the organization has accumulated a tremendous amount of this kind of information. So far, seven editions of the book One Hundred out of Fifteen Thousand, in three volumes, have been published (Izvestiya. Moscow. 1992; Izvestiya. Moscow. 1994; Human Rights. Moscow. 2000).

 Legal Advice to Parents of Dead Soldiers. The periodical covers a range of important legal issues faced by parents who lost their children during their military service. It includes legal cases of the Mother's Right Foundation which became legal precedents. Four editions of the periodical have been issued so far (Human Rights. Moscow. 1997; 2000; 2005; 2008).  The third and the fourth editions were distributed to 2,600 federal courts of the Russian Federation.

5. The foundation works with the media and issues press releases and bulletins; 
6. The foundation provides affordable financial support to parents of dead soldiers; 
7. The foundation works to provide emotional and psychological support to parents of dead soldiers; 
8. The foundation is assisted by volunteers and interns.

Prominent Cases 

1. The foundation provided legal support to parents and widows of Heroes of the Russian Federation (1999–2010).

2. The Mother's Right Foundation successfully defended one of its applicants in a criminal case in the Constitutional Court of the Russian Federation (Decision of the RF Constitutional Court No. 447-O of 5 December 2003)

3. As a result of the work of the Mother's Right Foundation, the families of the submariners who perished in the Kursk submarine disaster were recognized as the wronged party.,.

4. The Mother's Right Foundation helped to ensure compensation for moral damage in the case of the loss of the Armavir Special Forces Detachment in Chechnya caused by a friendly fire:

5. The foundation's case in the Supreme Court of the Russian Federation led to the cancellation of Decree of the Ministry of Defense No. 444 of 02.12.1997 (Decision of the RF Supreme Court No. VKPI-00-27 of 27.04.2000).

Rating of Military Units in the Russian Federation 

In the autumn of 2004 the Mother's Right Foundation issued a rating of the most dangerous military units in Russia in the past 10 years (1994-2004). The rating was based on the analysis of 5,433 questionnaires filled out by parents of dead soldiers, who contacted the Foundation during the period of 1994–2004. 
The Article ‘Eyes Toward Death’ (Artyom Davydov. Moskovsky Komsomolets) caused a public outcry.

Actions 

In 2010–2011, the Mother's Right Foundation started a project in the social net Odnoklassniki.ru that was dedicated to the memory of servicemen who died in the army during peacetime. The Foundation's activists set up dead servicemen's accounts to present their profiles in the first person - as if written by the victims. They also displayed the dead servicemen's pictures with mourning ribbons. Thus, their abandoned profiles and data revived on the pages of their friends who learnt about their lives and deaths. The project was performed by a group of volunteers. They asked the servicemen's parents’ permission to use their sons’ personal data. “The idea of the Odnoklassniki project is simple: the Ministry of Defense was interested in the boys only when they were called up to military service. And now, after their tragic deaths, they are forgotten, as if they never existed. We consider it unfair. They have been and will always be alive to their parents and close relatives. We would like other people to hear their voices. These boys joined the army and fulfilled their military duty and thus, they deserve to be heard by society,” reported Veronica Marchenko, Board Chair of the Mother's Right Foundation, to Interfax. “The project is meant to prevent the Ministry of Defense from consigning to oblivion the servicemen’s names and faces, and turn them into indifferent numbers of the official statistics. Many people will now read the soldiers’ stories. It has nothing to do with the spiritualistic séance. As a rule, parents of dead soldiers were grieving the loss of their sons in isolation,” tells the head of the foundation. “Nobody cared about them. Now, they receive comments from hundreds of people. They receive words of encouragement. For the first time, they feel the sympathy of society.” “We really like the foundation’s idea,” says Ivan Sergeyevich Dolin, citizen of Tchaikovsky Town, Perm Region, and the father of Anton Dolin who was bullied to death in the Vityaz Special Forces Detachment, Dzerzhinsky Division, Moscow Region. “Let people remember them.”

Charity 

At the end of December 2000, a charitable auction organized by the deputies of the State Duma of the Russian Federation, V. E. Koptev-Dvornikov, V. O. Semyonov and A. Y. Vulf, was held at the Metelitsa Club in Moscow. Altogether, 58 lots belonging to 51 celebrities were sold. The most expensive lot was Alsou's concert dress. Other lots - from most to less expensive - were as follows: Lev Leschenko's hat, Iosif Kobzon's concert costume, Anatoly Karpov's first chess set, Kristina Orbakaite's concert dress, Tatyana Ovsienko's wedding dress, Valery Leontiev's tail-coat, Larisa Dolina's concert dress, and Irina Khakamada's home kimono. The raised funds were transferred into the account of the Mother's Right Foundation (totaling over 500,000 rubles). The funds were evenly distributed among the parents of the soldiers who perished in Chechnya.
In 2006, the foundation raised 127,249 rubles in donations to help the mother of Andrey Sychyov who was bullied to death during his military service.,.

Awards 
In 2004, Kariera made the first rating of Russian charitable organizations and foundations. The Mother's Right Foundation was awarded the 4th place among 400 nominees.

In accordance with the results of the contest organized by the SuperJob.Ru Portal in 2008, the foundation was recognized as the Employer of Choice.

Location 

The office of the foundation is located in the Central Administrative District of Moscow in Luchnikov Lane. It has been there since August 1992. Like many public organizations, the foundation had to fight to have their office in a convenient and accessible location.

Internet Representation 
 Foundation blog in LiveJournal
 Foundation's group in Facebook
 Foundation's profile in Facebook
 Foundation's account in Twitter

Video Materials 
 We Are Against Deaths in the Army
 Letters of a Dead Man: Evgeny Shirshov, 1998
 Memorial Service for Those Who Died in the Army, February 23, 1999
 Cases Against the Ministry of Defense (the Chechen Lawsuits) 1999-2001
 Day of Commemoration and Mourning for Those who Died in Military Service, February 23, 2001
 The Case Against the Russian Northern Fleet (‘Kursk’ Nuclear Submarine), 2002
 Died in Military Service: Vasily Nikolayev, 2006

References

External links

External links 
 

Human rights organizations based in Russia